The 2003–04 Dallas Stars season was the Stars' 11th season, 37th overall of the franchise.

Off-season
On July 3, defenseman Derian Hatcher signed a five-year contract with the Detroit Red Wings. Mike Modano was named his replacement as team captain later the same day.

Regular season
Only 369 total goals (194 for Dallas, 175 for their opponents) were scored in the Stars' regular-season games: the lowest total of all 30 NHL teams. Twenty-one games of their 82 regular-season games ended in a shutout. They also tied the Columbus Blue Jackets for most times shut out, with 11.

Final standings

Playoffs

Round 1: (4) Colorado Avalanche vs. (5) Dallas Stars

The series began in Colorado. The Avalanche won the first two games; game 1 was by a score of 3-1 and game 2 was a 5-2 victory. Games 3 & 4 shifted to Dallas. Game 3 was won by Dallas 4-3 in overtime. However, in game 4, the Avalanche responded with a 3-2 double overtime win. Back in Denver for game 5, Colorado would go on to win 5-1 and clinch the series 4-1.

Schedule and results

Regular season

|- align="center" bgcolor="#CCFFCC" 
|1||W||October 8, 2003||4–1 || align="left"|  Mighty Ducks of Anaheim (2003–04) ||1–0–0–0 || 
|- align="center" bgcolor="#CCFFCC" 
|2||W||October 11, 2003||3–1 || align="left"| @ Nashville Predators (2003–04) ||2–0–0–0 || 
|- align="center" bgcolor="#FFBBBB"
|3||L||October 13, 2003||3–4 || align="left"| @ Buffalo Sabres (2003–04) ||2–1–0–0 || 
|- align="center" bgcolor="#FFBBBB"
|4||L||October 15, 2003||0–2 || align="left"|  Boston Bruins (2003–04) ||2–2–0–0 || 
|- align="center" bgcolor="#CCFFCC" 
|5||W||October 17, 2003||4–2 || align="left"|  Washington Capitals (2003–04) ||3–2–0–0 || 
|- align="center" bgcolor="#CCFFCC" 
|6||W||October 19, 2003||3–1 || align="left"|  Minnesota Wild (2003–04) ||4–2–0–0 || 
|- align="center" bgcolor="#FFBBBB"
|7||L||October 22, 2003||1–3 || align="left"|  Toronto Maple Leafs (2003–04) ||4–3–0–0 || 
|- align="center" bgcolor="#FFBBBB"
|8||L||October 24, 2003||0–4 || align="left"| @ Detroit Red Wings (2003–04) ||4–4–0–0 || 
|- align="center" bgcolor="#CCFFCC" 
|9||W||October 25, 2003||3–2 || align="left"| @ Columbus Blue Jackets (2003–04) ||5–4–0–0 || 
|- align="center" bgcolor="#CCFFCC" 
|10||W||October 29, 2003||4–3 OT|| align="left"|  Calgary Flames (2003–04) ||6–4–0–0 || 
|-

|- align="center" 
|11||T||November 1, 2003||1–1 OT|| align="left"| @ Nashville Predators (2003–04) ||6–4–1–0 || 
|- align="center" bgcolor="#CCFFCC" 
|12||W||November 2, 2003||7–3 || align="left"|  Nashville Predators (2003–04) ||7–4–1–0 || 
|- align="center" bgcolor="#FFBBBB"
|13||L||November 4, 2003||0–3 || align="left"| @ New York Rangers (2003–04) ||7–5–1–0 || 
|- align="center" bgcolor="#FFBBBB"
|14||L||November 6, 2003||1–4 || align="left"| @ New York Islanders (2003–04) ||7–6–1–0 || 
|- align="center" bgcolor="#FFBBBB"
|15||L||November 8, 2003||1–4 || align="left"| @ Boston Bruins (2003–04) ||7–7–1–0 || 
|- align="center" bgcolor="#FFBBBB"
|16||L||November 12, 2003||2–6 || align="left"|  Detroit Red Wings (2003–04) ||7–8–1–0 || 
|- align="center" 
|17||T||November 14, 2003||3–3 OT|| align="left"|  Phoenix Coyotes (2003–04) ||7–8–2–0 || 
|- align="center" bgcolor="#FFBBBB"
|18||L||November 15, 2003||0–3 || align="left"| @ Colorado Avalanche (2003–04) ||7–9–2–0 || 
|- align="center" 
|19||T||November 19, 2003||3–3 OT|| align="left"|  Mighty Ducks of Anaheim (2003–04) ||7–9–3–0 || 
|- align="center" bgcolor="#CCFFCC" 
|20||W||November 21, 2003||3–1 || align="left"|  Los Angeles Kings (2003–04) ||8–9–3–0 || 
|- align="center" bgcolor="#FFBBBB"
|21||L||November 22, 2003||1–2 || align="left"| @ St. Louis Blues (2003–04) ||8–10–3–0 || 
|- align="center" bgcolor="#CCFFCC" 
|22||W||November 24, 2003||5–2 || align="left"|  Phoenix Coyotes (2003–04) ||9–10–3–0 || 
|- align="center" bgcolor="#CCFFCC" 
|23||W||November 26, 2003||3–1 || align="left"| @ Minnesota Wild (2003–04) ||10–10–3–0 || 
|- align="center" bgcolor="#CCFFCC" 
|24||W||November 28, 2003||2–0 || align="left"|  New Jersey Devils (2003–04) ||11–10–3–0 || 
|- align="center" bgcolor="#FFBBBB"
|25||L||November 30, 2003||1–2 || align="left"|  Los Angeles Kings (2003–04) ||11–11–3–0 || 
|-

|- align="center" bgcolor="#FFBBBB"
|26||L||December 4, 2003||0–3 || align="left"| @ Los Angeles Kings (2003–04) ||11–12–3–0 || 
|- align="center" bgcolor="#FFBBBB"
|27||L||December 6, 2003||1–2 || align="left"| @ San Jose Sharks (2003–04) ||11–13–3–0 || 
|- align="center" bgcolor="#FFBBBB"
|28||L||December 7, 2003||0–4 || align="left"| @ Mighty Ducks of Anaheim (2003–04) ||11–14–3–0 || 
|- align="center" bgcolor="#FFBBBB"
|29||L||December 10, 2003||1–2 || align="left"| @ Phoenix Coyotes (2003–04) ||11–15–3–0 || 
|- align="center" bgcolor="#CCFFCC" 
|30||W||December 12, 2003||1–0 || align="left"|  Chicago Blackhawks (2003–04) ||12–15–3–0 || 
|- align="center" 
|31||T||December 14, 2003||1–1 OT|| align="left"| @ Chicago Blackhawks (2003–04) ||12–15–4–0 || 
|- align="center" bgcolor="#CCFFCC" 
|32||W||December 17, 2003||3–1 || align="left"|  Vancouver Canucks (2003–04) ||13–15–4–0 || 
|- align="center" bgcolor="#FFBBBB"
|33||L||December 19, 2003||0–1 || align="left"| @ Florida Panthers (2003–04) ||13–16–4–0 || 
|- align="center" bgcolor="#CCFFCC" 
|34||W||December 20, 2003||2–1 || align="left"| @ Tampa Bay Lightning (2003–04) ||14–16–4–0 || 
|- align="center" bgcolor="#CCFFCC" 
|35||W||December 22, 2003||3–1 || align="left"| @ Carolina Hurricanes (2003–04) ||15–16–4–0 || 
|- align="center" bgcolor="#CCFFCC" 
|36||W||December 26, 2003||2–1 || align="left"|  Nashville Predators (2003–04) ||16–16–4–0 || 
|- align="center" bgcolor="#CCFFCC" 
|37||W||December 27, 2003||4–3 || align="left"| @ Columbus Blue Jackets (2003–04) ||17–16–4–0 || 
|- align="center" 
|38||T||December 29, 2003||2–2 OT|| align="left"|  Philadelphia Flyers (2003–04) ||17–16–5–0 || 
|- align="center" 
|39||T||December 31, 2003||1–1 OT|| align="left"|  Montreal Canadiens (2003–04) ||17–16–6–0 || 
|-

|- align="center" bgcolor="#FFBBBB"
|40||L||January 2, 2004||0–6 || align="left"|  Phoenix Coyotes (2003–04) ||17–17–6–0 || 
|- align="center" 
|41||T||January 3, 2004||2–2 OT|| align="left"| @ Los Angeles Kings (2003–04) ||17–17–7–0 || 
|- align="center" 
|42||T||January 5, 2004||2–2 OT|| align="left"| @ Mighty Ducks of Anaheim (2003–04) ||17–17–8–0 || 
|- align="center" bgcolor="#CCFFCC" 
|43||W||January 8, 2004||2–1 || align="left"|  Atlanta Thrashers (2003–04) ||18–17–8–0 || 
|- align="center" bgcolor="#FFBBBB"
|44||L||January 10, 2004||2–4 || align="left"|  Colorado Avalanche (2003–04) ||18–18–8–0 || 
|- align="center" bgcolor="#CCFFCC" 
|45||W||January 13, 2004||3–0 || align="left"| @ San Jose Sharks (2003–04) ||19–18–8–0 || 
|- align="center" bgcolor="#FFBBBB"
|46||L||January 15, 2004||1–4 || align="left"| @ Colorado Avalanche (2003–04) ||19–19–8–0 || 
|- align="center" bgcolor="#CCFFCC" 
|47||W||January 17, 2004||3–2 || align="left"| @ Calgary Flames (2003–04) ||20–19–8–0 || 
|- align="center" bgcolor="#CCFFCC" 
|48||W||January 19, 2004||3–2 || align="left"| @ Vancouver Canucks (2003–04) ||21–19–8–0 || 
|- align="center" bgcolor="#FFBBBB"
|49||L||January 20, 2004||0–3 || align="left"| @ Edmonton Oilers (2003–04) ||21–20–8–0 || 
|- align="center" bgcolor="#CCFFCC" 
|50||W||January 23, 2004||2–0 || align="left"|  St. Louis Blues (2003–04) ||22–20–8–0 || 
|- align="center" bgcolor="#CCFFCC" 
|51||W||January 24, 2004||3–2 || align="left"| @ St. Louis Blues (2003–04) ||23–20–8–0 || 
|- align="center" 
|52||T||January 26, 2004||2–2 OT|| align="left"|  Detroit Red Wings (2003–04) ||23–20–9–0 || 
|- align="center" bgcolor="#CCFFCC" 
|53||W||January 28, 2004||5–3 || align="left"|  Ottawa Senators (2003–04) ||24–20–9–0 || 
|- align="center" bgcolor="#CCFFCC" 
|54||W||January 30, 2004||3–1 || align="left"|  San Jose Sharks (2003–04) ||25–20–9–0 || 
|- align="center" bgcolor="#CCFFCC" 
|55||W||January 31, 2004||5–4 || align="left"| @ Phoenix Coyotes (2003–04) ||26–20–9–0 || 
|-

|- align="center" bgcolor="#CCFFCC" 
|56||W||February 4, 2004||1–0 || align="left"|  Columbus Blue Jackets (2003–04) ||27–20–9–0 || 
|- align="center" 
|57||T||February 11, 2004||4–4 OT|| align="left"|  New York Islanders (2003–04) ||27–20–10–0 || 
|- align="center" bgcolor="#FFBBBB"
|58||L||February 14, 2004||2–3 || align="left"| @ Phoenix Coyotes (2003–04) ||27–21–10–0 || 
|- align="center" bgcolor="#FFBBBB"
|59||L||February 16, 2004||1–3 || align="left"| @ Mighty Ducks of Anaheim (2003–04) ||27–22–10–0 || 
|- align="center" bgcolor="#CCFFCC" 
|60||W||February 18, 2004||4–3 || align="left"| @ Los Angeles Kings (2003–04) ||28–22–10–0 || 
|- align="center" bgcolor="#CCFFCC" 
|61||W||February 20, 2004||5–1 || align="left"|  Colorado Avalanche (2003–04) ||29–22–10–0 || 
|- align="center" bgcolor="#CCFFCC" 
|62||W||February 22, 2004||4–0 || align="left"|  Mighty Ducks of Anaheim (2003–04) ||30–22–10–0 || 
|- align="center" 
|63||T||February 25, 2004||1–1 OT|| align="left"|  Los Angeles Kings (2003–04) ||30–22–11–0 || 
|- align="center" bgcolor="#CCFFCC" 
|64||W||February 27, 2004||3–1 || align="left"|  Minnesota Wild (2003–04) ||31–22–11–0 || 
|- align="center" bgcolor="#CCFFCC" 
|65||W||February 29, 2004||5–4 OT|| align="left"|  Edmonton Oilers (2003–04) ||32–22–11–0 || 
|-

|- align="center" bgcolor="#CCFFCC" 
|66||W||March 3, 2004||4–2 || align="left"|  Columbus Blue Jackets (2003–04) ||33–22–11–0 || 
|- align="center" bgcolor="#CCFFCC" 
|67||W||March 5, 2004||5–1 || align="left"|  Calgary Flames (2003–04) ||34–22–11–0 || 
|- align="center" bgcolor="#CCFFCC" 
|68||W||March 7, 2004||4–0 || align="left"|  San Jose Sharks (2003–04) ||35–22–11–0 || 
|- align="center" bgcolor="#FFBBBB"
|69||L||March 9, 2004||0–4 || align="left"| @ Pittsburgh Penguins (2003–04) ||35–23–11–0 || 
|- align="center" 
|70||T||March 11, 2004||2–2 OT|| align="left"| @ Philadelphia Flyers (2003–04) ||35–23–12–0 || 
|- align="center" bgcolor="#FFBBBB"
|71||L||March 13, 2004||0–3 || align="left"| @ Detroit Red Wings (2003–04) ||35–24–12–0 || 
|- align="center" bgcolor="#CCFFCC" 
|72||W||March 14, 2004||4–0 || align="left"| @ Chicago Blackhawks (2003–04) ||36–24–12–0 || 
|- align="center" 
|73||T||March 16, 2004||3–3 OT|| align="left"|  San Jose Sharks (2003–04) ||36–24–13–0 || 
|- align="center" bgcolor="#CCFFCC" 
|74||W||March 18, 2004||3–0 || align="left"|  Vancouver Canucks (2003–04) ||37–24–13–0 || 
|- align="center" bgcolor="#CCFFCC" 
|75||W||March 20, 2004||3–1 || align="left"|  St. Louis Blues (2003–04) ||38–24–13–0 || 
|- align="center" bgcolor="#CCFFCC" 
|76||W||March 22, 2004||4–0 || align="left"| @ Calgary Flames (2003–04) ||39–24–13–0 || 
|- align="center" bgcolor="#CCFFCC" 
|77||W||March 24, 2004||4–3 OT|| align="left"| @ Edmonton Oilers (2003–04) ||40–24–13–0 || 
|- align="center" bgcolor="#FF6F6F"
|78||OTL||March 27, 2004||2–3 OT|| align="left"| @ Vancouver Canucks (2003–04) ||40–24–13–1 || 
|- align="center" bgcolor="#FF6F6F"
|79||OTL||March 28, 2004||1–2 OT|| align="left"| @ San Jose Sharks (2003–04) ||40–24–13–2 || 
|- align="center" bgcolor="#FFBBBB"
|80||L||March 31, 2004||1–3 || align="left"|  Edmonton Oilers (2003–04) ||40–25–13–2 || 
|-

|- align="center" bgcolor="#FFBBBB"
|81||L||April 2, 2004||2–4 || align="left"| @ Minnesota Wild (2003–04) ||40–26–13–2 || 
|- align="center" bgcolor="#CCFFCC" 
|82||W||April 4, 2004||5–2 || align="left"|  Chicago Blackhawks (2003–04) ||41–26–13–2 || 
|-

|-
| Legend:

Playoffs

|- align="center" bgcolor="#FFBBBB"
| 1 || April 7 || Dallas || 1–3 || Colorado || || Turco || 18,007 || Avalanche lead 1–0 || 
|- align="center" bgcolor="#FFBBBB"
| 2 || April 9 || Dallas || 2–5 || Colorado || || Turco || 18,007 || Avalanche lead 2–0 || 
|- align="center" bgcolor="#CCFFCC"
| 3 || April 12 || Colorado || 3–4 || Dallas || OT || Turco || 18,532 || Avalanche lead 2–1 || 
|- align="center" bgcolor="#FFBBBB"
| 4 || April 14 || Colorado || 3–2 || Dallas || 2OT || Turco || 18,532 || Avalanche lead 3–1 || 
|- align="center" bgcolor="#FFBBBB"
| 5 || April 17 || Dallas || 1–5 || Colorado || || Turco || 18,007 || Avalanche win 4–1 || 
|-

|-
| Legend:

Player statistics

Scoring
 Position abbreviations: C = Center; D = Defense; G = Goaltender; LW = Left Wing; RW = Right Wing
  = Joined team via a transaction (e.g., trade, waivers, signing) during the season. Stats reflect time with the Stars only.
  = Left team via a transaction (e.g., trade, waivers, release) during the season. Stats reflect time with the Stars only.

Goaltending

Awards and records

Awards

Transactions
The Stars were involved in the following transactions from June 10, 2003, the day after the deciding game of the 2003 Stanley Cup Finals, through June 7, 2004, the day of the deciding game of the 2004 Stanley Cup Finals.

Trades

Players acquired

Players lost

Signings

Draft picks
Dallas's draft picks at the 2003 NHL Entry Draft held at the Gaylord Entertainment Center in Nashville, Tennessee.

Notes

References

 
 

Dall
Dall
Dallas Stars seasons